Metavolcanic rock is volcanic rock that shows signs of having experienced metamorphism. In other words, the rock was originally produced by a volcano, either as lava or tephra. The rock was then subjected to high pressure, high temperature or both, for example by burial under younger rocks, causing the original volcanic rock to recrystallize. Metavolcanic rocks are sometimes described informally as metavolcanics.

When it is possible to determine the original volcanic rock type from the properties of the metavolcanic rock (particularly if the degree of metamorphism is slight), the rock is more precisely named by appylying the prefix meta- to the original rock type. For example, a weakly metamorphosed basalt would be described as a metabasalt, or a weakly metamorphosed tuff as a metatuff. 

Metavolcanic rock is commonly found in greenstone belts.

See also

References

Metamorphic rocks
Volcanic rocks
Metamorphic petrology